The Treaty of Salbai was signed on 17 May 1782, by representatives of the Maratha Empire and the British East India Company after long negotiations to settle the outcome of the First Anglo-Maratha War it was signed between Warren
Hastings and Mahadaji Sindhia. Under its terms, the Company retained control of Salsette and Broach and acquired guarantees that the Marathas would defeat Hyder Ali of Mysore and retake territories in the Carnatic. The Marathas also guaranteed that the French would be prohibited from establishing settlements on their territories. In return, the British agreed to pension off their protégé, Raghunath Rao, and acknowledge Madhavrao II as peshwa of the Maratha Empire. The British also recognised the territorial claims of the Mahadji Shinde west of the Jumna River and all the territories occupied by the British after the Treaty of Purandar were given back to the Marathas.

The Treaty of Salbai resulted in a period of relative peace between the Maratha Empire and the British East India Company until outbreak of the Second Anglo-Maratha War in 1802. David Anderson concluded the Treaty of Salbai on behalf of the East
India Company.

References

Sources
Olson, James Stuart and Shadle, Robert. Historical Dictionary of the British Empire. Greenwood Press, 1996. 

History of Mumbai
Salbai
Salbai
Salbai
Salbai
1782 treaties
1782 in Great Britain
1782 in India
1782 in the Maratha Empire
History of Gwalior